William R. Hoyt was a state senator in South Carolina during the Reconstruction era from 1868 until 1870. He represented Colleton County. He was from Massachusetts.

He served in the First Massachusetts Cavalry and was a mason by trade. 

Hoyt worked as a builder in Walterboro, South Carolina. He was listed as a member of the South Carolina Senate in 1868. He was identified as "colored".

He was stabbed by a political rival on election day in 1870 and left South Carolina the following year.

References

Year of birth missing
Year of death missing
Place of birth missing
Place of death missing
South Carolina state senators
19th-century American politicians
African-American politicians during the Reconstruction Era
Union Army soldiers
People of Massachusetts in the American Civil War